Joseph Edamaruku (7 September 1934 – 29 June 2006), popularly identified by his surname Edamaruku, was a journalist and rationalist from Kerala. He was the Delhi Bureau chief of the Malayalam magazine Keralasabdam for more than twenty years, and the founder-editor of Therali, a rationalist periodical in Malayalam. He was president of the Indian Rationalist Association from 1995 to 2005.

Edamaruku influenced a generation of freethinkers in 1970s and 1980s. His books were best-sellers in Kerala during those times. As a rationalist and an atheist, he wrote over 170 books on various subjects ranging from religion to philosophy to miracles. His autobiography, The Times that Raised the Tempest, won a Kerala Literary Academy award. He also translated and published in Malayalam the complete works of Abraham Kovoor. His son, Sanal Edamaruku, is an Indian rationalist and president of the Rationalist International, who is currently in exile in Finland.

Selected publications

 Upanishathukal Oru Vimarsana Patanam (Upanishands: A Critical Study)
Upanishathukal Oru Vimarsana Patanam 
 Quran Oru Vimarsana Patanam (Quran: A Critical Study)
 Yukthivada Rashtram (Rationalist Nation)
 Kovoorinte Sampoorna Krithikal (Complete Works of Abraham Kovoor: Translation)
Jaina Matham
Naveena Brahmana Matham
Ivar Matha Nishedhikal
India Gazetteer and Bhoomisasthra Nighandu
Kodumkattuyarthiya Kalam
Samsarikkunna Kuthira

Awards
 Kerala Sahitya Akademi Award, Biography and Autobiography (1999)

See also 
Indian Rationalist Association (IRA) 
Kerala Yukthivadi Sangham

References

External links 
 Indian Atheist Publishers
 Obituary at www.newkerala.com
 Stauch Rationalist - The Hindu
 Remembering Joseph Edamaruku by Sanal Edamaruku > 

1934 births
2006 deaths
Indian sceptics
Indian rationalists
Indian materialists
Activists from Kerala
Malayali people
Journalists from Kerala
Indian atheism activists
Malayalam-language journalists
Indian male writers
20th-century Indian journalists